The Museum of Arts of Uzbekistan is the largest state art museum in Uzbekistan. Its permanent collection contains more than several thousands works, divided among four curatorial departments. The museum was established in 1918 as a Museum of People University and renamed as a Central Arts Museum later. It was named as Tashkent Art Museum in 1924 and finally Museum of Arts of Uzbekistan in 1935.

History
The museum was established in 1918 and was located in former palace of Prince Nikolay Romanov till 1935. It was moved to People's House in 1935. In 1974, the People's House building was demolished replaced by a current one.

Building

Three Soviet architects Abdulov, Nikiforov and Rosenblum designed the new building of museum in the form of a huge cube, with all sides separated into even metal squares, lined with aluminum sheets on the outside.
The lower part of the building and the entrance are decorated with polished gray marble. The upper part is glazed with chrom-brugnatellite, smoothing the sunlight and setting indoor matte illumination.

Collection
The initial collection of the museum consisted of a hundred works of art from prince Nikolay Romanov and other individuals private collections, nationalized in April 1918. Those were mostly paintings and drawings by Russian and Western European masters, sculptures, furniture and porcelain. Immediately after establishing the museum, its collection was enlarged with works from the collection of the Turkestan local history museum. Some works were transferred from museum collections in Moscow and Leningrad - for example, in 1920–1924 the museum received 116 works of Russian art from the 18th to 20th centuries, among them portraits by Vladimir Borovikovsky, Tropinin, Karl Bryullov, Yaroshenko, Repin and many others. The museum also purchased about 250 paintings of pre-revolutionary artists who were active in Central Asia: Igor Kazakov, Nikolay Karazin, Sommer.
From the second half of the 1930s, the museum's collection was expanded mostly with works by Uzbekistan artists, including works of Usto Mumin, Pavel Benkov, Leo Bure.

In addition to its permanent collection, the museum holds exhibitions of Uzbek and international artists.

Museum Collections are divided into four departments: National applied art of Uzbekistan, Fine arts of Uzbekistan, Russian and Western art, Far East art.

Controversy
The chief curator of museum Mirfayz Usmonov was found selling artworks in black market for 15 years, replacing them with copies. He was caught in 2014, prosecuted and sentenced to 9 years in jail. Two other employees of museum were sentenced to eight years each.

Gallery

References

External links

Museum of Arts of Uzbekistan website 
Tashkent Museums, Craft Centres and Galleries from "Aba Trip"

1918 establishments in Uzbekistan
Museums established in 1918
Art museums and galleries in Uzbekistan
National museums
Museums in Tashkent